Petta metro station is a metro station of Kochi Metro.

References

Kochi Metro stations
Railway stations in India opened in 2020